This is a list of foreign players in the Ligue 1, which commenced play in 1932. The following players must meet both of the following two criteria:
Have played at least one Ligue 1 game. Players who were signed by Ligue 1 clubs, but only played in lower league, cup and/or European games, or did not play in any competitive games at all, are not included.
Are considered foreign, i.e., outside France and its dependencies (Guadeloupe, Martinique, Réunion or French Polynesia), determined by the following:
A player is considered foreign if he is not eligible to play for the national teams of France.
More specifically,
If a player has been capped on international level, the national team is used; if he has been capped by more than one country, the highest level (or the most recent) team is used. These include French players with dual citizenship. Players who played for France but came as foreign players (such as Miguel Ángel Lauri) are also listed.
If a player has not been capped on international level, his country of birth is used, except those who were born abroad from French parents or moved to France at a young age, and those who clearly indicated to have switched his nationality to another nation.

Clubs listed are those that the player has played at least one Ligue 1 game for.

Seasons listed are those that the player has played at least one Ligue 1 game in. Note that seasons, not calendar years, are used. For example, "1992-95" indicates that the player has played in every season from 1992–93 to 1994–95, but not necessarily every calendar year from 1992 to 1995.

In bold: international players

Last updated February 14, 2013

 A
 B
 C
 D
 E
 F
 G
 H
 I
 J
 K
 L
 M
 N
 P
 Q
 R
 S
 T
 U
 V
 W
 Y
 Z

References and notes

Books

Club pages
AJ Auxerre former players
AJ Auxerre former players
Girondins de Bordeaux former players
Girondins de Bordeaux former players
Les ex-Tangos (joueurs), Stade Lavallois former players
Olympique Lyonnais former players
Olympique de Marseille former players
FC Metz former players
AS Monaco FC former players
Ils ont porté les couleurs de la Paillade... Montpellier HSC Former players
AS Nancy former players
FC Nantes former players
Paris SG former players
Red Star Former players
Red Star former players
Stade de Reims former players
Stade Rennais former players
CO Roubaix-Tourcoing former players
AS Saint-Étienne former players
Sporting Toulon Var former players

Others
stat2foot
footballenfrance
French Clubs' Players in European Cups 1955-1995, RSSSF
Finnish players abroad, RSSSF
Italian players abroad, RSSSF
Romanians who played in foreign championships
Swiss players in France, RSSSF
EURO 2008 CONNECTIONS: FRANCE, Stephen Byrne Bristol Rovers official site

Notes

France
 
Association football player non-biographical articles
Expatriate footballers in France
Ligue 1 records and statistics